Asghar Ali Shah may refer to:

 Asghar Ali Shah (boxer) (born 1978) Pakistani boxer
 Asghar Ali Shah (politician) (born 1938) Pakistani politician